Edythe ("Edie") Sterling Clark is an American nonfiction author who lives in the Monadnock Region of New Hampshire. She is known for her writings with Yankee magazine, and books on New England life.

Early life 
Clark was born in Summit, New Jersey, and graduated from Beaver College, now known as Arcadia University. In 1973 she and her first husband moved to New Hampshire, as a part of the country life movement.

Writing 
Clark's first book, The Place He Made, is a memoir of her husband, Paul Bolton, who died of cancer at the age of 39. In the book Clark examined her recent experience of cancer and at death. The New York Times Book Review called The Place He Made "a triumph of the human spirit . . . sure to take its place among the best of the literature." Subsequent works include As Simple As That, which is a collection of her essays and vignettes from the Mary's Farm columns she wrote for Yankee, and Saturday Beans and Sunday Suppers: Kitchen Stories from Mary's Farm, a combination of memoir and recipes. 

Clark also wrote for Yankee magazine, with her first article appearing in 1979. Several of Clark's stories appeared in the 1985 edition of the "Best of Yankee Magazine", including "Abby Rockefeller's Graywater Greenhouse" (January 1979), "The First Frost" (September), and "The Man Who'd Sooner Lamps" (November). In writing the forward for the edition, the editor noted that one nomination for articles that should be included indicated "anything by Edie Clark". 

In 2001, Clark created the text for an orchestral work entitled Monadnock Tales in collaboration with composer Larry Siegel which was first presented in Keene, New Hampshire.

Selected publications

References 

Living people
1948 births
Arcadia University alumni
21st-century American women writers
American women memoirists
Writers from New Hampshire
21st-century American non-fiction writers